Lieven Scheire (born 3 May 1981) is a Belgian comedian, mainly known for being a member of Neveneffecten.

Career
Scheire attended secondary school at the Sint-Lodewijkscollege in Lokeren; he then began a physics degree at Ghent University, but dropped out to become a stand-up comedian. He won the Lunatic Stand-up Comedy Award in 2002. Scheire also did a year long stint as an exchange student in Reykjavík, Iceland where he attended Fjölbrautarskólinn í Breiðholti

Neveneffecten (founded by him and his cousin Jonas Geirnaert) won the jury prize at the Groninger Studenten Cabaret Festival in 2003. Since then they have been touring Flanders and The Netherlands with their comedy theatre show and making various sketch shows for Flemish television.

Television
 Het Geslacht De Pauw (2005)
 Neveneffecten (2005)
 Willy's en Marjetten (2006)
 De Laatste Show (2007)
 Basta (2011)
 Scheire en de Schepping (2012)
 De Schuur van Scheire (2015)
 De allesweter (2015)
 Team Scheire (2018,2020)
 Kan Iedereen Nog Volgen? (2019)
 De Code Van Coppens (2019,2020)

External links

Neveneffecten
Physics blog
Lieven Scheire on YouTube

Belgian male comedians
Living people
1981 births
Flemish cabaret
People from Wachtebeke